The Boxing Tournament at the 1962 Asian Games was held at the Senayan Tennis Stadium (now known as Center Court) in Jakarta, Indonesia between 25 and 31 August 1962.

Barkat Ali of Pakistan won the heavyweight gold without a fight in the absence of his only would to be opponent Chang Lo-pu from Taiwan. India's Padam Bahadur Mall was voted the best boxer at the Games.

Medalists

Medal table

Participating nations
A total of 65 athletes from 11 nations competed in boxing at the 1962 Asian Games:

References

External links
Results

 
1962 Asian Games events
1962
Asian Games
1962 Asian Games